The Progresu Power Station is a large thermal power plant located in Bucharest, having 4 generation groups of 50 MW each having a total electricity generation capacity of 200 MW. Its chimney is the tallest structure in Bucharest with a height of 240 metres.

External links
Official site 

Natural gas-fired power stations in Romania